The 2013 Port Huron Patriots season was the second season for the Continental Indoor Football League (CIFL) franchise. The Patriots kicked off their exhibition schedule with a 62–2 victory over the Michigan Renegades, a semi-professional outdoor football team.

Roster

Schedule

Regular season

Standings

Coaching staff

References

2013 Continental Indoor Football League season
Port Huron Patriots
Port Huron Patriots